The 1976 Virginia Slims of Houston  was a women's tennis tournament played on indoor carpet courts at the Astro Arena in Houston, Texas in the United States that was part of the 1976 Virginia Slims World Championship Series. It was the sixth edition of the tournament and was held from January 12 through January 18, 1976. Second-seeded Martina Navratilova won the singles title and earned $15,000 first-prize money.

Finals

Singles
 Martina Navratilova defeated  Chris Evert 6–3, 6–4
 It was Navratilova's 1st singles title of the year and the 6th of her career.

Doubles
 Françoise Dürr /  Rosie Casals defeated  Chris Evert /  Martina Navratilova 6–0, 7–5

Prize money

See also
 Evert–Navratilova rivalry

References

Virginia Slims of Houston
Virginia Slims of Houston
Virginia Slims of Houston
Virginia Slims of Houston
Virginia Slims of Houston
Virginia Slims of Houston